Sebastiano Dolci (1699-1777) was a Ragusan historian and writer. In 1750 he published a biography of Saint Jerome. He joined the Franciscans at the age of 14 years, in 1744 he wrote about the Franciscan Order in Ragusa. The Italian word Dolci means Sweet (Confectionery) in English language. The word Slade is Croatian language variation of the word Dolci.

Monumenti Storici della Provincia Francescana di Ragusa (Neapel).

He was also a great scholar of the Illyrian language, publishing several books on this subject: 
De Illiricae linguae vetustate et amplitudine, Venice 1754"; 
Fasti litterarii Ragusini, sive vivorum literatorum qui usque ad annum 1766 n Ragusina claruerunt ditione prospectus alphab.ordine exhibitus..."(Venice 1767). About the Ragusan/Dubrovnik Literary Chronicle)

In the theological scope, Slade translates the epistle of Hyeronymi Francisci Zanetti to illyrian language (Ferrara, 1754).

See also
 Republic of Ragusa
 List of notable Ragusans
 Dubrovnik
 Dalmatia
 History of Dalmatia

References

External links
 Sebastiano Dolci
 Christian Classics Ethereal Library: The Principal Works of St. Jerome

1699 births
1777 deaths
Ragusan writers
People from the Republic of Ragusa
Friars Minor
Slavists
18th-century Italian writers
18th-century Italian male writers
18th-century Latin-language writers